cdrkit is a collection of computer programs for CD and DVD authoring that work on Unix-like systems.
cdrkit is released under the GNU General Public License version 2.
Fedora, Gentoo Linux, Mandriva Linux, and Ubuntu all include cdrkit.
Joerg Jaspert is cdrkit's leader and release manager.

It was created in 2006 by Debian developers as a fork of cdrtools based on the last GPL-licensed version when cdrtools licensing changed.

Features 
The cdrkit includes many features for CD and DVD writing, such as
 creation of audio, data, and mixed (audio and data) CDs
 burning CD-R, CD-RW, DVD-r.
 usage without root identity is possible in many cases, some device drivers still may fail, show unexplainable problems
 can use device node instead of scsi id numbers on Linux

Components 
Major components include:
 wodim (an acronym for write optical disk media), which was forked from the cdrecord program in cdrtools.
icedax (an acronym for incredible digital audio extractor), which was forked from the cdda2wav program in cdrtools.
 genisoimage (short for generate ISO image), which was forked from the mkisofs program in cdrtools.

Front-ends 

Other software can use cdrkit tools in the back-end. cdrkit tools will maintain interface compatibility with cdrtools 2.01.01a08 at least for the near future. Numerous programs can therefore use it, including Brasero (the default GNOME Desktop CD/DVD application), K3b (the default KDE desktop application), and X-CD-Roast (desktop environment independent).

History

A license dispute arose between the Debian maintainers and the since deceased cdrtools author Jörg Schilling. The Debian developers said that the GPL license is not compatible with the CDDL license that covers part of the cdrtools code. In contrast, cdrtools maintainer Jörg Schilling stated that there is no problem with the license, and also felt that the Debian fork is not legally redistributable. The Red Hat legal team differed with Schilling's position, saying that he has not provided them with any proof of either license or copyright violation in cdrkit.

Schilling also said that the cdrkit fork reintroduced various bugs from the first versions of cdrtools, which were already fixed in later cdrtools versions. Debian developers considered that some of these changes were necessary to solve existing problems, rather than being bugs.

References

External links
 cdrkit (fork of cdrtools) uploaded to Debian, please test (fork announcement)
 Cdrtools - why do Linux distributions create bad forks?, essay by Jörg Schilling referring to cdrkit without mentioning its name
 Debburn SVN repository which contains cdrkit

Debian
Free optical disc authoring software
Optical disc authoring software